Mark Addis FRSA (b. 1969) is a British philosopher who is known for his work on Ludwig Wittgenstein

Biography
Addis grew up in Bolton, England, and was educated at Bolton School, Mansfield College, Oxford, the University of Leeds, the University of York and Birmingham City University. He has been a visiting scholar at Georgia State University, USA (2005) and at Aarhus University, Denmark. Addis has since 2006 been general editor of the Philosophy Insights series for Humanities-Ebooks LLP.  He was treasurer of the British Philosophical Association. Addis was a consultant  for the film Le Week-End.

Addis specialises in the philosophy of Wittgenstein and related areas as well as having research interests in the philosophies of language, mind, and religion. His book Wittgenstein: Making Sense of Other Minds (1999) was described by Rom Harre as "a careful and subtle study" whose "scholarly merits are great". Wittgenstein and Philosophy of Religion (2001, co-edited with Robert Arrington) is "an interesting and valuable collection of essays", while Wittgenstein: A Guide for the Perplexed (2006) is "a clear, balanced and very recommendable book which gives a good idea of the complexity of Wittgenstein's philosophy".

Bibliography

Monographs
Wittgenstein : Making Sense of Other Minds (Aldershot: Ashgate, 1999). 
Wittgenstein: A Guide for the Perplexed (London: Continuum, 2006).  (hbk), 0-8264-8496-4 (pbk)
Wittgenstein and Philosophy of Religion (co-edited with Robert Arrington, London: Routledge, 2001).  (hbk), 0-415-33555-8 (pbk)

Essays and chapters
'D. Z. Phillips' Fideism in Wittgenstein's Mirror', in Wittgenstein and Philosophy of Religion pp. 85–100
'Wittgenstein and the Transfinite in Set Theory', in Klaus Puhl, ed., Wittgenstein's Philosophy of Mathematics (Vienna: Holder-Pichler-Tempsky, 1993), pp. 87–92. 
Entries on Reuben Louis Goodstein pp. 336–7, Margeret Macdonald pp. 601–5, Margeret Masterman pp. 664–5, and David Pears pp. 756–60 in Stuart Brown, ed., Dictionary of Twentieth-Century British Philosophers (Bristol: Thoemmes Press, 2005).  (Reprinted in A.C. Grayling, Andrew Pyle, Naomi Goulder eds., Continuum Encyclopedia of British Philosophy (Thoemmes Continuum, London 2006), as Goodstein pp. 1256–7, MacDonald pp. 1997–8, Masterman p. 2104, and Pears pp. 2454–7. )
'Intellectual Property and the Public Interest', in The International Journal of the Book 6:1 (2009), pp. 121–124. 
'Wittgenstein's Private Language Argument and Self Consciousness', in Sats-Nordic Journal of Philosophy 8:2 (2007), pp. 89–103.  (Reprinted in Analysis and Metaphysics 6 (Dec. 2007),pp. 288–302. )
'Criteria: the State of the Debate', in Journal of Philosophical Research XX (1995), pp. 139–174. 
'Surveyability and the Sorites Paradox', in Philosophia Mathematica 3:2 (1995), pp. 157–165. 
'Philosophy in the Workplace', in Philosophy Now 95 (2013)

References

External links
 Mark Addis's page at Academia.edu 

1969 births
British philosophers
Analytic philosophers
Alumni of the University of York
Living people
People educated at Bolton School
Wittgensteinian philosophers